Bob Kilpatrick (b. Louisville, Kentucky, 25 October 1952) is an American singer, songwriter, record producer, broadcaster, and inventor.

Musical history
Kilpatrick, of Scottish American descent, is best known for composing the gospel standard "In My Life Lord Be Glorified".

Kilpatrick's live musical output is a mix of folk, gospel and progressive rock. As a songwriter, Kilpatrick has garnered critical and popular acclaim for his work. His 2003 compilation album Think Pray Groove documents his many musical influences that are highlighted with a live version of In My Life Lord, Be Glorified. In 2006, Kilpatrick released  This Changes Everything. This was inspired by the passing of one of his spiritual mentors and also contains direct references to his Christian faith. Kilpatrick is also a national spokesman for the Colorado-based children's charity Compassion International and travels frequently for musical and Christian ministry purposes (he is also an ordained minister) and is a regular contributor to the Christian musician Summits that occur in the Pacific Northwest.

Discography
This Changes Everything 2006
The Studio Collection 2005
The Live Collection 2005
Let It Shine Like That 2003
Think, Pray, Groove 2003
Face to Face 2000
Find It Here 1999
Songs For God 1998 (featuring Geoff Thurman, Chris Falson & Will Derryberry)
An Evening in Sacramento 1998
Prints 1997
Lord Be Glorifed 1996
Won By One 1992
The Long March...plus some 1990

References

External links
 
 Fair Oaks Music
 

American performers of Christian music
Living people
Musicians from Louisville, Kentucky
American male singer-songwriters
Singer-songwriters from Kentucky
Year of birth missing (living people)